Jubël is a Swedish duo originating from Halmstad, Sweden and made up of Sebastian Atas and Victor Sjöström. They are signed to Warner Music. They had worked separately for many years. But a collaboration in "Illusion" resulted in some fame with it being chosen for the theme of a global advertisement for the retailer and fashion line H&M. But it was their remix of the song "Dancing in the Moonlight" originally recorded in 1970 by Kelly Sherman's band Boffalongo and made a huge hit by King Harvest. Jubël's version released 2018 and featuring vocals by Neimy initially charted in Sweden, Norway and Belgium. A rerelease in 2020 gave a bigger international boost with charting in the UK Singles Chart and peaked at number 11. It also charted on ARIA, the Australian Official Singles Chart also in 2020. The song was used in series 6 of the reality show Love Island in 2020 and spread to TikTok. and reached the top of the British radio list.

Meanwhile Jubël released its debut album Strawtown in 2019 and Strawtown EP in 2020 and follow up hits "On the Beach", a remix of a Chris Rea song charting in Finland and topping the Finnish Airplay chart for one week and "Someone" charting in Sverigetopplistan in Sweden in 2020. "Teenage Minds" and "Running Out of Love" have been radio hits. Jubël also performed at Stockholm's Lollapalooza.

Discography

Albums

Extended plays

Singles

*Did not appear in the official Belgian Ultratop 50 charts, but rather in the bubbling under Ultratip charts.

Notes

References

External links
Jubël Facebook

Swedish musical duos